Goliad County is a county located in the U.S. state of Texas.  As of the 2020 census, the population is 7,012. Its county seat is Goliad. The county is named for Father Miguel Hidalgo; "Goliad" is an anagram , minus the silent H. The county was created in 1836 and organized the next year.

Goliad County is a part of the Victoria, TX Metropolitan Statistical Area.

History 
The first declaration of independence for the Republic of Texas was signed in Goliad on December 20, 1835, although the formal declaration was made by the Convention of 1836 at Washington-on-the-Brazos. Goliad County was the site of two battles in the Texas Revolution. The Battle of Goliad was a minor skirmish early in the war. However the subsequent battle of Coleto was an important battle that culminated on March 27, 1836. Col. James Fannin and his Texan soldiers were executed by the Mexican army, under orders from Gen. Antonio López de Santa Anna, in what became known as the Goliad Massacre. This event led to the Texas Revolutionary battle cry "Remember the Alamo! Remember Goliad!" Although many remember the Alamo today, fewer remember Goliad. The site of the massacre is located near Presidio la Bahia, just south of the town of Goliad.

In 1874, Juan Moya,  a prominent Tejano landowner and Mexican army captain who fought in the Texas Revolution, was lynched, along with his two sons, by a mob who suspected them of murdering a neighboring family in Goliad County.

Goliad County is also the birthplace of General Ignacio Zaragoza, who led the Mexican army against the invading forces of Napoleon III in the Battle of Puebla on May 5, 1862 ("Cinco de Mayo").

Geography

Major Highways
  U.S. Highway 59
  Interstate 69W is currently under construction and will follow the current route of U.S. 59 in most places.
  U.S. Highway 77 Alternate/U.S. Highway 183
  State Highway 119
  State Highway 239
  Farm to Market Road 81
  Farm to Market Road 622
  Farm to Market Road 883

Adjacent counties
 DeWitt County (north)
 Victoria County (northeast)
 Refugio County (southeast)
 Bee County (southwest)
 Karnes County (northwest)

Demographics

Note: the US Census treats Hispanic/Latino as an ethnic category. This table excludes Latinos from the racial categories and assigns them to a separate category. Hispanics/Latinos can be of any race.

As of the census of 2000, there were 6,928 people, 2,644 households, and 1,975 families residing in the county.  The population density was 8 people per square mile (3/km2). There were 3,426 housing units at an average density of 4 per square mile (2/km2). The racial makeup of the county was 82.62% White, 4.82% Black or African American, 0.55% Native American, 0.22% Asian, 0.01% Pacific Islander, 10.05% from other races, and 1.73% from two or more races. 35.20% of the population were Hispanic or Latino of any race.

There were 2,644 households, out of which 33.10% had children under the age of 18 living with them, 62.10% were married couples living together, 8.70% had a female householder with no husband present, and 25.30% were non-families. 22.80% of all households were made up of individuals, and 11.90% had someone living alone who was 65 years of age or older. The average household size was 2.57 and the average family size was 3.02.

In the county, the population was spread out, with 25.90% under the age of 18, 6.50% from 18 to 24, 25.00% from 25 to 44, 25.20% from 45 to 64, and 17.50% who were 65 years of age or older.  The median age was 40 years. For every 100 females, there were 98.90 males. For every 100 females age 18 and over, there were 94.10 males.

The median income for a household in the county was $34,201, and the median income for a family was $40,446. Males had a median income of $30,954 versus $20,028 for females. The per capita income for the county was $17,126. About 11.90% of families and 16.40% of the population were below the poverty line, including 25.70% of those under age 18 and 11.10% of those age 65 or over.

Education
Goliad County is served by the Goliad Independent School District.

Communities

City
 Goliad (county seat)

Unincorporated communities
 Angel City
 Berclair
 Fannin
 Weesatche

Politics

See also

 List of museums in South Texas
 National Register of Historic Places listings in Goliad County, Texas
 Recorded Texas Historic Landmarks in Goliad County
 Texas Cart War

References

External links
 Goliad County Government
 Goliad County Chamber of Commerce
 Goliad County in Handbook of Texas Online
 "Goliad County Profile" from the Texas Association of Counties 

 
Victoria, Texas metropolitan area
1837 establishments in the Republic of Texas
Populated places established in 1837